Rien que pour ça... is the second album by the French singer Elsa Lunghini and was released in 1990.NB. Sound quality: ADD.

Background and critical reception

In this album, recorded in London, Elsa continued her musical collaboration with her father, Georges Lunghini, since he was co-producer of the album and composed all the tracks with Vincent-Marie Bouvot, except the eponymous title, which was composed by Elsa herself.

For the texts, Elsa was surrounded by famous lyricists : Gérard Presgurvic and Thierry Séchan, Renaud's brother.

This album confirmed the success of Elsa to the public : indeed, in addition to being certified double Gold by the SNEP, it allowed her to go on stage for the first time. Indeed, she climbed on Olympia stage, Paris, in October 1990 to perform songs from her first two albums.

In 1991, "Je s'rai là" was released as the fourth single from the album, but as a promotional CD in Canada only.

Track listing

1 Only on CD and cassette versions of the album.

Album credits

Personnel
Richard Cottle – keyboards, orchestration & saxophone
"Wide" Al Hodge – guitar
Paul Westwood – bass guitar
Dave Mattacks – drums
Jimmy Chambers – backing vocals
Katie Kissoon – backing vocals
Elsa – backing vocals
Pete Wingfield – backing vocals

Production
Arrangement: Richard Cottle, Gus Dudgeon
Produced by Gus Dudgeon for RockMasters
Engineered by Helen Woodward
Assistant engineer: John McDonnell
Mixed by Gus Dudgeon & Helen Woodward
Executive producer: Georges Lunghini

Design
Michel Figuet – photography
François-René Richez – cover design

Charts, certifications and sales

References

1990 albums
Elsa Lunghini albums
Ariola Records albums
Albums produced by Gus Dudgeon